= Avant Charlemagne: Au temps des rois barbares =

Avant Charlemagne: Au temps des rois barbares is a 1986 French tabletop role-playing game published by Jeux Robert Laffont.

== Gameplay ==
Avant Charlemagne: Au temps des rois barbares is a game in which a role‑playing game is set in Europe between 500 and 800 AD that combines detailed historical context with fantasy elements, offering rules, a solo scenario, 110 pages of history, and an 80‑page campaign.

== Reviews ==
- Casus Belli #35
- Jeux & Stratégie #43
